Dance Partner, (Japanese: ダンスパートナー, foaled 25 May 1992) is a Japanese Thoroughbred racehorse and broodmare. From the first crop of foals sired by Sunday Silence she won four of her twenty-five races and finished second nine times in a racing career which lasted from January 1995 until December 1997. She was unraced as a juvenile, but in 1995 she won the Yushun Himba and won the JRA Award for Best Three-Year-Old Filly. As a four-year-old she won the Keian Hai and the Queen Elizabeth II Commemorative Cup and won the JRA Award for Best Older Filly or Mare. She failed to win as a five-year-old and was retired from racing at the end of the year. Apart from her victories she was placed in the Oka Sho, Prix de la Nonette Kyoto Daishoten and Takarazuka Kinen (twice). She has had success as a broodmare, producing several good winners.

Background
Dance Partner is a bay mare bred in Japan by Shadai Farm. She was from the first crop of foals sired by Sunday Silence, who won the 1989 Kentucky Derby, before retiring to stud in Japan where he was champion sire on thirteen consecutive occasions. His other major winners included Deep Impact, Stay Gold, Heart's Cry, Manhattan Cafe, Zenno Rob Roy and Neo Universe. Her dam Dancing Key was an unraced, American-bred mare who became a very successful broodmare in Japan: her other foals included Dance in the Dark and Dance in the Mood (Oka Sho).

During her racing career, Dance Partner was owned by Toshiaki Shirai and trained by Katsumi Yoshida.

Racing career

1995: three-year-old season
Dancing Partner began her racing career by winning a maiden race over 1200 metres at Kokura Racecourse on 29 January. She then competed at Kyoto Racecourse where she finished second to Shake Hand in the Elfin and second again to Yuki Vivace in the Grade III Tulip Sho. She was moved up to Grade I level for the Oka Sho over 1600 metres at Kyoto on 9 April when she finished second of the eighteen runners behind Wonder Perfume. On 21 May Dance Partner was one of eighteen fillies to contest the 56th running of the Yushun Himba over 2400 metres at Tokyo Racecourse. Ridden by Yutaka Take she won from Yuki Vivace with Wonder Perfume in third.

In late summer, Dance Partner was sent to Europe and ran twice in France. In the Group Three Prix de la Nonette at Deauville Racecourse on 27 August she took the lead in the straight but was caught in the final stride and beaten a short head by the Poule d'Essai des Pouliches winner Matiara. Two weeks later she started 2.3/1 favourite for the Group One Prix Vermeille at Longchamp Racecourse but finished sixth of the ten runners behind Carling.

In late autumn the filly returned to Japan and was matched against colts for the first time in the Kikuka Sho over 3000 metres on 7 November, finishing fifth behind Mayano Top Gun. On her final appearance of the year she finished second to Samani Beppin in the Grade II Sankeisports Hai Hanshin Hinba Tobubetsu at Hanshin Racecourse on 17 December.

In January 1996, Dance Number was named Best Three-Year-Old Filly at the JRA Awards for 1995.

1996: four-year-old season
In the early part of 1996, Dance Partner finished second to Kanetsu Cross in the American Jockey Club Cup, second to T M Jumbo in the Kyoto Kinen and fourth to Taiki Blizzard in the Osaka Hai. On 11 May she was dropped to Grade III level for the Keihan Hai over 2200 metres at Kyoto and recorded her first success of the season as she won from Ibuki Tamon Yagura and Nehai Caesar. In her two remaining races of the spring campaign she was moved back up to Grade I level, finishing sixth to Trot Thunder in the Yasuda Kinen and third behind Mayano Top Gun and Sunday Branch in the Takarazuka Kinen.

In October Dance Partner returned from her summer break and finished fourth to Marvelous Sunday in the Kyoto Daishoten. On November 10 she competed in all-female competition for the first time in 1996 when she was one of sixteen fillies and mares to contest the Queen Elizabeth II Commemorative Cup. Ridden by Hirofumi Shii she won the Grade I prize from Hishi Amazon (winner of the race in 1994), Fair Dance and She's Grace. The runner-up was demoted to seventh after a steward's inquiry. In her two remaining races of that year, Dance Partner finished tenth behind Singspiel in the Japan Cup and sixth behind Sakura Laurel in the Arima Kinen.

Dance Partner won her second JRA Award in January 1997 when she was voted Best Older Filly or Mare for 1996.

1997: five-year-old season
Dance Partner began her third season with a trip to Hong Kong for the Queen Elizabeth II Cup at Sha Tin Racecourse on 13 April, and finished eighth behind the South African-trained London News. On her return to Japan she finished third to Bubble Gum Fellow in Naruo Kinen at Hanshin in June. In July she finished third for the second consecutive year in the Takarazuka Kinen, beaten by Marvelous Sunday and Bubble Gum Fellow.

Dance Partner returned in October and finished second to the three-year-old colt Silk Justice in the Kyoto Daishoten and then attempted to repeat her 1996 success in the Queen Elizabeth II Commemorative Cup on 9 November. She narrowly failed to complete the double, being beaten a neck into second place by the four-year-old Erimo Chic. In December she was again invited to contest the Arima Kinen, but made no impact and finished unplaced behind Silk Justice.

Breeding record
Dance Partner was retired to become a broodmare at Shadai Farm. To date, she has produced ten named foals and nine winners:

Royal Partner, a bay filly, foaled in 1999, sired by Helissio. Won three races.
Dream Partner, bay colt, later gelded, 2000, by Helissio. Won four races.
Dance All Night, bay filly, 2003, by El Condor Pasa. Won five races.
Mambo Partner, brown colt, later gelded, 2005, by Kingmambo. Won nine races.
Smarty Dance, chestnut filly, 2006, by Smarty Jones. Won one race.
Federalist, brown colt, 2007, by Empire Maker. Won seven races including Grade II Nakayama Kinen.
Longing Dancer, brown colt, 2009, by Symboli Kris S. Won five races.
Laka, bay filly, 2010, by King Kamehameha. Failed to win in eighteen races.
Reign Over, brown colt, later gelded, by King Kamehameha. Won two races. In training January 2016.
Key For Success, brown colt, 2012, by King Kamehameha. Won two races. In training January 2016.

Pedigree

References 

1992 racehorse births
Racehorses bred in Japan
Racehorses trained in Japan
Thoroughbred family 7